Zothera is a compilation album by Mentallo & The Fixer, released on September 26, 2014 by Alfa Matrix. The collection comprises remastered audio of the band's first two albums for Zoth Ommog, 1993's Revelations 23 and Where Angels Fear to Tread, packaged with a third disc featuring previously unreleased remixes and versions. A free bonus compilation of eighteen tracks is also included, titled Sounds From the Matrix 015, featuring previously unreleased songs from then forthcoming releases for Alfa Matrix.

Reception
Brutal Resonance gave Zothera a mixed to positive review of six out of ten and said "it's nice to see Alfa-Matrix catering to both fans of the old and new, and also reintroducing albums that may have never seen the light of day again if not for their dedication to the scene, but, overall, I'm crossed as to whether or not this box set is worth buying." Peek-A-Boo Magazine credited Revelations 23 and Where Angels Fear to Tread for not sounding dated and said "Apocrypha also reaches their high standards, with False prophets (shotgun messiah mix) being a favourite."

Track listing

Personnel
Adapted from the Zothera liner notes.

Mentallo & The Fixer
 Dwayne Dassing (as The Fixer) – programming (1.1, 1.10, 1.12, 2.3, 2.8, 2.12-2.14, 3.6, 3.8, 3.12-3.15), engineering (1.12, 2.2, 2.8, 2.12-2.13, 3.11), mixing (1.12, 2.8, 2.12-2.13), recording (2.8, 2.12-2.13), remixer (2.2, 3.11)
 Gary Dassing (as Mentallo) – programming (1.2-1.9, 1.11, 1.13, 2.1-2.7, 2.9-2.11, 2.14, 3.1-3.7, 3.9-3.11, 3.16), editing (3.1-3.9, 3.1-3.16), engineering (1.1-1.11, 1.13, 2.1-2.7, 2.9-2.11, 2.14, 3.1-3.10, 3.12-3.16), mixing (1.1-1.11, 1.13, 2.1-2.7, 2.9-2.11, 2.14, 3.10), recording (2.1-2.7, 2.9-2.11, 2.14), remastering (1.1-1.13, 2.1-2.14, 3.1-3.16), remixer (3.1-3.9, 3.11-3.6)

Additional performers
 Todd Kreth – guitar (3.16)

Production and design
 Tomoki Hayasaka – cover art

Release history

References

External links 
 
 Zothera at Bandcamp
 Zothera at iTunes

2014 compilation albums
Mentallo & The Fixer albums
Alfa Matrix compilation albums